Naue is a surname. Notable people with the surname include:

Georg Naue, German sailor and Olympic medalist
Johann Friedrich Naue (1787–1858), German composer and organist
Julius Naue (1835–1907), German painter, illustrator and archaeologist

Surnames of German origin